Gorge FC is an amateur soccer team based out of Hood River, Oregon.  They started playing in the National Premier Soccer League in 2014.  They will play in the Golden Gate Division of the West Region.  The Gorge FC's team owner is Roger Sherrell.

History
The team was founded in 2013 and known as SO Samba FC.  They began to play at Columbia Gorge Community College in Hood River.

References

External links
 Gorge FC official website

National Premier Soccer League teams
Soccer clubs in Oregon
2014 establishments in Oregon
Hood River, Oregon